Alan Bonnell Hathway (May 22, 1906 – April 15, 1977) was an editor at Newsday, a daily newspaper for the Long Island suburbs of New York City, from the early 1940s until 1970. He began as city editor, then became managing editor and eventually executive editor. He was often characterized as an old-style newspaperman similar to those in the play The Front Page.

In the 1930s and 1940s, Hathway was also a pulp fiction writer. He wrote several Doc Savage novels under the pseudonym Kenneth Robeson in the early 1940s.

In 1959, when Hathway was Managing Editor at Newsday, he gave fledgling reporter Robert Caro the advice to “Turn every page. Never assume anything. Turn every goddam page.”  And promoted Caro to investigative reporter.

Doc Savage novels
The Devil's Playground (January 1941)
The Headless Men (June 1941)
The Mindless Monsters (September 1941)
The Rustling Death (January 1942)

References

External links
Hathway info at The Hidalgo Trading Co.

1906 births
1977 deaths
20th-century American novelists
American male novelists
Pulp fiction writers
20th-century American male writers